Persecution of Muhajirs or Human rights abuses against Muhajirs or Anti-Muhajir sentiment ranges from discrimination, mass killings, forced disappearances and torture, to political repression and suppression of freedom of speech of Muhajirs, mainly those belonging to the right wing party Muttahida Qaumi Movement – Pakistan.The European Muhajir Network claimed that that over 1.3 million Muhajirs have died in Pakistan as a result targeted killings and genocides.

Extrajudicial Killings and Torture 
According to Amnesty International, extrajudicial executions of Muhajirs by law enforcement personnel, often portrayed by the authorities as "encounters" with police, continued to be reported from Karachi with distressing frequency. In Karachi, extra judicial killings against Muhajirs is not a new phenomenon. It began in 1992 during an operation against MQM.

1992-94 
From 1992 to 1994, the MQM was the target of the Pakistan Army's Operation Clean-up, The period is regarded as the bloodiest period in Karachi's history, with thousands of MQM workers and supporters killed or gone missing. Although 25 years have passed since the alleged arrest or disappearance of MQM workers, families of the missing people are still hopeful after registering the cases in the Supreme Court of Pakistan.  The operation left thousands of Muhajir civilians dead. During the operation clean-up there was growing evidence that the Rangers and police were involved in human rights abuses, including beatings, extortion, disappearances, torture and extrajudicial executions of suspected militants in faked encounter killings of Muhajirs. The police and army carried out raids, mass round-ups and siege-and-search operations in pursuit of MQM(A) leaders and militants over the next 30 months, thousands of ordinary MQM supporters and Muhajir were subjected to arbitrary arrest and detention, extrajudicial execution, beatings, torture, extortion and other ill-treatment.

1994-96 
During tenure of Benazir Bhutto, interior minister General Naseerullah Babar conducted second operation against MQM between 1994 and 1996. On 5 September 1995, 8 MQM supporters were killed and 11 were injured when security forces attacked what the MQM billed as a peaceful protest against abuses by security forces against MQM women workers. Due to serious doubts over credibility of operation due to fake encounters, extra judicial killings and rise of killings in Karachi, Benazir Bhutto's government was dismissed by the then President of Pakistan, Farooq Ahmed Laghari.

Extrajudicial killing of Farooq Dada 
On 2 August, Farooq Patni, alias Farooq Dada, and three other MQM workers, Javed Michael, Ghaffar Mada and Hanif Turk, were shot dead by police in an alleged armed "encounter" near the airport when, according to police, they failed to stop and opened fire on the police. Family members, however, claimed that the men had earlier been arrested from their homes. Moreover, another MQM worker, Mohammad Altaf, arrested later on the same day was reportedly identified by Farooq Dada and his three companions when they were brought to Altaf's house by police to help identify him. Witnesses were reported to have seen the four MQM workers at the time of Altaf's arrest; they were at that time reportedly held in shackles.

2015-16 Operations 
In 2015, a senior policeman, who declined to be named, put the figure of deaths of MQM workers at 1,000, saying a majority of the deaths were extrajudicial killings. Three other serving officials confirmed the assessment. In 2015, the HRCP expressed concern over the rise in extrajudicial killings and lack of transparency about the number of MQM activists picked up or later let off. During Nine Zero raid, MQM worker Waqas Shah was brutally shot down by Ranger's 9mm pistol fire from point blank range. The video evidence released on electronic media confirmed the incident. Farooq Sattar's coordination officer Syed Aftab Ahmed was killed while in the custody of paramilitary forces. Initially the force denied torture and stated that he died of heart attack but it had to accept after social media publicized videos of torture marks on Aftab's body and autopsy report conforming death due to torture. During the raid on Nine Zero, Syed Waqas Ali Shah was shot by rangers, “Don’t misbehave with the women,” were said to be the 25-year-old Shah's last words to Rangers personnel, who according to eye-witnesses accounts were shoving and pushing women protesting outside the MQM headquarters. As a result of operation, MQM claims 67 of its workers have been extra judicially murdered the paramilitary force while 150 are still missing and more than 5,000 are behind bars. The Amnesty International, US state department, United Nations Human rights commission has published several documents highlighting gross human rights violations during the targeted operation against MQM.

Arbitrary Arrests and Detention 
Cordon-and-search or siege-and-search operations, in which entire neighborhoods are surrounded while security forces personnel conduct house-to-house searches for arms and suspected militants, were frequent occurrences during the last few months of Operation Clean-up. Between July and March of 1995, diplomatic sources estimate over 75,000 Muhajirs were arrested. Siege-and-search operations provided both police and Rangers with ample opportunity for large-scale extortion, a cause for bitter resentment. Police allegedly gave families the chance to buy the freedom of many youths who could not be proved to have terrorist links. As many Karachiites saw it, both the sweeps and the squeeze on the wider Muhajir community amounted to a calculated policy of collective punishment. "Government policy was to terrorize the population and let the security forces loot and plunder," says one veteran Karachi analyst, a bitter critic of the MQM who enthusiastically applauds the methods used. "Policy [for the security forces] was quite clear: you're going to destroy the terrorists and loot the Muhajirs -- show them that allegiance to the MQM is going to cost them." The ex-mayor of Karachi, Waseem Akhtar was put behind bars without any charge by the anti-terror court and is waiting Sindh High Court to grant him bail in order to resume his office as the mayor of Karachi.

Disappearances 
An unknown number of Muhajirs have "disappeared" in the custody of the law enforcement agencies or have been held for prolonged periods in incommunicado detention; these appear to include mostly workers and supposed sympathizers of the MQM in Karachi.

Massacres

Qasba Aligarh Massacre 

The Qasba–Aligarh massacre was a massacre that happened when recently settled armed tribal Afghan Refugees attacked densely populated civilized locals in Qasba Colony, Aligarh Colony and Sector 1-D of Orangi in Karachi in the early hours of the morning on 14 December 1986. According to official reports, around 49 people were killed (unofficial reports are significantly higher at 400) and several hundred were injured in what was perceived as a "revenge killing" by newly settled armed Afghan Refugees following an unsuccessful raid on an Afghan heroin processing and distribution center in Sohrab Goth by the security forces. Most of the residents of the two colonies happened to be Muhajirs like Biharis who had been freshly repatriated from Bangladesh.

Pucca Qila Massacre 
On 27 May 1990, Sindh government launched a crackdown in Hyderabad, the center of MQM power. A shoot- on-sight curfew was imposed, and a police house-to-house search began. The Muhajirs protested at this treatment and fighting broke out. In what has become known as 'the Pucca Qila massacre'. More than 250 women and children were killed, leading to retaliations in Karachi and elsewhere and over 300 more deaths.

1988 Hyderabad Massacre 

The 1988 Hyderabad massacre, also known as Black Friday was the coordinated massacre of more than 250 Muhajir civilians in Hyderabad, Sindh near Hyderabad cantt on September 30, 1988. Identified gunmen, led by Sindhi nationalist and terrorist Qadir Magsi, opened fire on a large unarmed crowd. Sindhi nationalists, including Qadir Magsi, and the Sindh Taraqi Pasand Party, were widely seen as responsible for the massacre.

Suppression of Freedoms

Suppression of Freedom of Speech 
Government of Pakistan instructed with Pakistan Electronic Media and Regulatory Authority PEMRA (Secretly & Covertly) has put a ban on Altaf Hussain's speeches and has ordered not be televised, telecast or publish in print media and other magazines.

Suppression of Political Freedom 
MQM offices were also bulldozed in Aram Bagh, Kharadar, District East, Malir and other areas of the metropolis over the past three days. In 2016, 32 offices of the MQM located in different areas of Karachi were demolished. Moreover, MQM’s more than two hundred offices have been sealed till now.

Reactions

USA 
US has expressed concern over the condition of Muhajirs in Pakistan and urged the Nawaz Sharif government to safeguard minority rights in the country.

“…the United States continues to work hard and in our engagements both bilaterally with countries as well as broad reports, like our Human Rights Report, to detail and express concern and to engage with governments to support the rights of marginalized, disadvantaged minority groups around the world,” Elizabeth Trudeau, Director, Press Office, US State Department said in a briefing in Washington on Tuesday.
This statement comes within a fortnight of Muttahida Quami Movement plea to Washington seeking intervention of the US lawmakers into alleged human rights violations against the Muhajir community in Pakistan by army and security forces.

United States expressed concern over human rights violations in Pakistan in view of the crackdown against the MQM which it is “monitoring closely”, the US has said all efforts to maintain law and order in Karachi must be made in accordance with the rule of law.

Protests

Protest at UN Headquarters 
Muhajirs from Pakistan held a peaceful demonstration in front of the United Nations headquarters in New York against the alleged human rights violations in the country. Displaying placards and banners calling the Pakistan Army generals "war criminals". The protest was organised by the United States wing of the Muttahida Qaumi Movement (MQM). The protestors claimed that thousands of innocent people of their community have been killed in Pakistan over the last three decades and several thousands have been held under illegal captivity without a trial.

Protests in United States

2014 
MQM America has staged a protest demonstration, on February 20, 2014, over the extrajudicial killings and enforced disappearances of MQM’s workers in Karachi. Junaid Fehmi, Central Organizer America, Joint Organizers Muhammad Arshad Hussain and Nadeem Siddiqui and members of central committee, in-charges and office bearers of different wings and a large number of Muhajirs participated the protest demonstration. They came to take part in the demonstration despite severe cold and snowing.

2020 
MQM USA held a peaceful protest in front of Lincoln Memorial in Washington, DC on Saturday, October 17, 2020 against the ongoing injustices in Muhajir Province, illegal occupation and sale of islands along Muhajir Province coast, illegal occupation of resources of Muhajir Province and Balochistan by Punjabi Establishment, sale of Muhajir Province minerals and land to China, and the ongoing military atrocities, illegal arrests, extrajudicial killings in Muhajir Province and Baluchistan. The demonstration was attended by a large number of Urdu-speaking Muhajirs.

Protests in Canada

2022 
Muttahida Qaumi Movement (MQM) Canada Toronto Chapter held a protest in Mississauga against the state brutalities in Pakistan. They protested against the burning of the MQM head office and parental residence of MQM founder leader Altaf Hussain in Azizabad, Karachi known as “Nine Zero” by paramilitary Rangers, the extrajudicial killing of its workers and the illegal arrest of former MNA Nisar Panhwar. The protesters carried pictures of MQM founder leader Mr. Altaf Hussain, former MNA Nisar Ahmed Panhwar and MQM flags. They carried placards against the burning of MQM leader Mr. Altaf Hussain's residence and MQM center known as Nine Zero, and extra-judicial killings of MQM activists, with words of condemnation written on them. The protestors continued to express their feelings by raising slogans against the state atrocities on MQM workers and Mohajirs in Pakistan from time to time.

References


Muhajir people